The Society of California Pioneers, established in 1850, is dedicated to the study and enjoyment of California art, history, and culture. Founded by individuals arriving in California before 1850 and thriving under the leadership of several generations of their direct descendants, the Society has continuously served its members, the academic community, and the public. As the oldest organization West of The Mississippi, The Society opened the first library in California, as well as a grand hall for meetings, lectures, and social events. Today The Society operates a public museum and a research library, both housed in one of the iconic Montgomery Barracks Buildings on The Presidio of San Francisco's historic Main Post.

Pioneer Hall features rotating exhibitions of art and artifacts amassed since 1850; free museum education programs for school-aged children, as well as public tours and events are offered. The Alice Phelan Sullivan Research Library, which houses a large portion of The Society's collections, is open to the public by appointment, allowing researchers and historians access to The Society's privately held repository of rare primary source materials.

The Society's service to the community is designed to support scholarship and encourage new interpretations that illuminate and honor the diverse experiences of those who came before us.

According to its constitution, The Society's mission is "to collect and preserve information connected with the early settlement and formation of this new state."

The Society continues to be a membership organization, and  "Membership is open to direct descendants of those who arrived in California prior to January 1, 1850."

Museum

The Society continues to exist and has its headquarters in San Francisco.  Pioneer Hall at The Presidio, which includes a museum (open to the public Wednesday to Sunday) and a research library (open by appointment only) is on the historic Main Post at 101 Montgomery, Suite 150 - Presidio of San Francisco, 94129.

The Society of California Pioneers’ archives document the founding and early history of California, including The Gold Rush, The Earthquake and Fire of 1906, and other defining events. The collection includes manuscripts and letters, paintings, prints and drawings, photographs, books, maps, newspapers and journals, the business ledgers of mining and transportation companies, as well as historic artifacts and decorative objects. An extensive collection of overland and pioneer diaries includes those of John A. Sutter and a letter by Henry W. Bigler, both primary sources announcing the discovery of gold in California. Works by Carleton Watkins, Eadweard Muybridge, Lawrence & Houseworth, and Turrill & Miller are held in our archive of photographs, panoramas, and daguerreotypes. Particularly notable for its nineteenth-century holdings, the painting collection includes works by Thomas Hill, William Coulter, Jules Tavernier, and Maynard Dixon. Together with The Society's collection of ephemera and prints, these form a vivid, visual record of life in California over time.

The museum exhibits art and artifacts from the Society's collections on a rotating basis.

References

External links

Clubs and societies in California
Pre-statehood history of California
Historical societies in California
Organizations established in 1850
History of San Francisco
People of pre-statehood California
People of the American Old West
People of the California Gold Rush
Museums in San Francisco
Historical society museums in California
1849 in the United States
State based fraternal and lineage societies
1850 establishments in California